Cledson Carvalho da Silva (born 6 February 1998), known as Dé, is a Brazilian football striker who plays for IFK Mariehamn.

References

1998 births
Living people
Brazilian footballers
Association football forwards
Iporá Esporte Clube players
Associação Atlética Anapolina players
Associação Atlética Internacional (Bebedouro) players
Anápolis Futebol Clube players
Águia de Marabá Futebol Clube players
IFK Mariehamn players
Campeonato Brasileiro Série D players
Veikkausliiga players
Brazilian expatriate footballers
Expatriate footballers in Finland
Brazilian expatriate sportspeople in Finland